Recordando a Felipe Pirela is the fifth solo album by Héctor Lavoe. It was released on 1979 under the label of Fania Records, and was produced by Willie Colón. The album was in homage to the famous Venezuelan bolero singer Felipe Pirela.

Track listing

 "Sombras Nada Más" - 4:02 
 "Vieja Carta" - 3:00 
 "El Infierno" - 4:45 
 "La Retirada" - 3:10
 "Pobre Del Pobre" - 4:26
 "El Retrato de Mamá" - 4:53
 "Sin Explicaciones" - 3:07
 "Castigo" - 3:15

Personnel
Héctor Lavoe - Vocals
Carlos Francetti - Arrangements on "Sombras Nada Más", "Vieja Carta", "El Infierno", "El Retrato de Mamá".
Jorge Calandrelli - Arrangements on "La Retirada", "Pobre del Pobre".
Louie Cruz: Arrangements on "Sin Explicaciones".

References

1979 albums
Héctor Lavoe albums
Fania Records albums